This article gives an overview of liberalism in Slovenia. It is limited to liberal parties with substantial support, mainly proved by having had a representation in parliament. The sign ⇒ means a reference to another party in that scheme. For inclusion in this scheme it isn't necessary so that parties labeled themselves as a liberal party.

History
After the independence of Slovenia former young socialists claim to have restarted the liberal tradition of former Austria-Hungary. Their organized liberalism became a major political force. The Liberal Democracy of Slovenia (Liberalna demokracija Slovenije, becomes a  member of the LI and the ELDR) and profiles itself as a left of center liberal party. Others argue that there have been no liberal parties in Slovenia since independence in 1991. They say that claims of the former communist youth (ZSMS) and LDS that they represent liberal parties with liberal doctrines are political propaganda and that facts demonstrate that both ZSMS and LDS followed socialist and anti liberal policies.

From National Party of Carniola to Democratic Party
1894: Ivan Tavčar led the Young Slovenes to establish the National Party of Carniola (Narodna stranka za Krajnsko). In Gorizia related groups formed the National Progressive  Party in 1900
1905: The Carniolan party is renamed National Progressive Party (Narodno napredna stranka). In Upper Styria related groups formed the National Party of Styria (Narodna stranka za Štajersko)
1918: The three party merged into the Yugoslav Democratic Party (Jugoslovanska demokratska stranka)
1919: The party merged with Serbian and Croatian into the pan-Yugoslav more or less liberal State Party of Serbian, Croatian and Slovene Democrats (Državnotvorna stranka demokrata Srba, Hrvata i Slovenaca). Some of the Slovene liberals did not join JDS and founded Independent Agrarian Party  (Samostojna kmetijska stranka) and National-Socialist Party  (Narodno-socialistična stranka). Except the name, the latter did not have much in common with German Nazis and could have been described as a social liberal party.
1919: The party is renamed into the Democratic Community (Demokratska zajednica)
1920: The party is renamed into the Democratic Party (Demokratska stranka). Leader is Ljubomir Davidović
1924: A faction, including the majority of prominent Slovene liberals  formed the Independent Democratic Party (Samostojna demokratska stranka), mainly active in Croatia, Bosnia, Vojvodina and Slovenia
1929: After the royal coup, all parties were banned.
1931: Slovene liberals leaders joined the government party (Yugoslav Radical-Peasant Democracy - Jugoslovenska radikalno-kmečka demokracija), from 1934 Yugoslav National Party  (Jugoslovenska nacionalna stranka). *1935-1941: JNS was in opposition.
1941-1945: Following the Axis occupation of Yugoslavia, political parties were dissolved but continued activities in underground. Facing the communist insurgence, Slovene liberals co-founded the underground national organization Slovene Covenant  (Slovenska zaveza).
1945: All democratic parties were dissolved and banned.

From ZSMS-Liberal Party to Liberal Democracy of Slovenia
1989: The Socialist Youth League of Slovenia (abbreviated ZSMS) changes its name into Za Svobodo Mislecega Sveta (For the Freedom of a Thinking World) and is shortly after reorganised into the Liberal Party (ZSMS - Liberalna stranka)
1990: The party is renamed into the Liberal Democratic Party (Liberalno demokratska stranka)
1994: The party merged with the ⇒ Democratic Party, a faction of the Slovenian Greens and the Socialist Party of Slovenia into the Liberal Democracy of Slovenia (Liberalna demokracija Slovenije), led by Janez Drnovšek

From Slovenian Democratic League to Democratic Party
1989: Oppositionals established the Slovenian Democratic League (Slovenska demokratična zveza)
1991: The party is renamed Democratic Party (Demokratska Stranka), led by Dimitrij Rupel
1994: Most of the party merged into the ⇒ Liberal Democracy of Slovenia. A faction continued under the label Democratic Party of Slovenia (Demokratska stranka Slovenije)

Zares, Positive Slovenia and Alliance of Alenka Bratušek
2004: Active Slovenia (Aktivna Slovenija) split from Youth Party of Slovenia.
2006: Zoran Janković founded Zoran Janković List (Lista Zorana Jankovića).
2007: Zares split from ⇒ LDS and merged with Active Slovenia.
2011: Zoran Janković founded Positive Slovenia (Pozitivna Slovenija) which also join LDS and Zares members
2014: Alenka Bratušek split from PS and founded Alliance of Alenka Bratušek (Zavezništvo Alenke Bratušek)
2015: Zares dissolved
2016: ZaAB is renamed Alliance of Social Liberal Democrats (Zavezništvo socialno-liberalnih demokratov)
2017: ZaSLD is renamed Party of Alenka Bratušek (Stranka Alenke Bratušek)
2022: SAB merged into ⇒ the Freedom Movement.

Civic List
2011: Gregor Virant founded Gregor Virant's Civic List (Državljanska lista Gregorja Viranta)
2012: LGV is renamed Civic List (Državljanska lista)

Modern Centre Party, Concretely and Freedom Movement
2014: Miro Cerar founded Party of Miro Cerar (Stranka Mira Cerarja)
2016: This party is renamed Modern Centre Party (Stranka modernega centra)
2018: Miro Cerar left the SMC after joining the 14th Government of Slovenia
2021: Former SMC member Jure Leben founded Green Actions Party (Stranka zelenih dejanj).
2021: The party merged with the ⇒ Economic Active Party into the Concretely (Konkretno).
2021: Igor Zorčič split from SMC and founded Liberal Democrats (Liberalni demokrati).
2022: Green Actions is renamed Freedom Movement (Gibanje Svoboda).

List of Marjan Šarec
2014: Marjan Šarec founded List of Marjan Šarec''' (Lista Marjana Šarca'')
2022: The party merged into ⇒ the Freedom Movement.

Liberal leaders
Janez Drnovšek - Anton Rop
Alenka Bratušek
Miro Cerar
Marjan Šarec
Robert Golob

See also
 Free Society Institute
 History of Slovenia
 Politics of Slovenia
 List of political parties in Slovenia

 
Slovenia
Politics of Slovenia